Nazacara (hispanicized spelling) or Nasa Q'ara (Aymara nasa nose, q'ara bare, bald) is a village in the La Paz Department in Bolivia. It is the seat of the Nazacara de Pacajes Municipality, the seventh municipal section of the Pacajes Province.

References 

Populated places in La Paz Department (Bolivia)